William George Pickel (born November 5, 1959 in Queens, New York) is a former defensive tackle who played for twelve seasons in the National Football League with the Los Angeles Raiders (1983–1990) and the New York Jets (1991–1994). Pickel attended St. Francis Prep. He played college football for Rutgers University. As a second round draft pick of the Raiders in 1983, Pickel overcame injuries to win a Super Bowl as a rookie, and was a sack threat during the early part of his career with the Raiders, making the 1985 All-Pro team. He is currently 98th in career sacks with 56. A standout player, Pickel played nearly every Raider defensive snap in 1984 and 1985. He had a distinctive 4-point stance, placing two hands down instead of the usual one, as was the case with other quick defensive tackles such as Bob Lilly and Tom Keating.

Pickel guest starred in a 1994 episode of Home Improvement. He is noted for his volunteer work with the Joshua Frase Foundation, a non-profit group that supports research for centronuclear myopathy.

See also
List of Rutgers University people

External links
NFL.com player page

1959 births
Living people
Sportspeople from Queens, New York
Players of American football from New York City
American football defensive tackles
Rutgers Scarlet Knights football players
Los Angeles Raiders players
New York Jets players
St. Francis Preparatory School alumni